Barnes Hospital may refer to:
Barnes Hospital, Cheadle in Greater Manchester, England
Barnes Hospital, London in Richmond upon Thames, England
Barnes-Jewish Hospital in St. Louis, Missouri, United States